Tom Wild (4 November 1855 – 2 May 1921) was an English first-class cricketer.

Wild represented Hampshire in two first-class matches in 1880 against the Marylebone Cricket Club and Sussex.

Wild died at Southampton, Hampshire on 2 May 1921.

External links
Tom Wild at Cricinfo
Tom Wild at CricketArchive

1855 births
1921 deaths
Cricketers from Southampton
English cricketers
Hampshire cricketers